Digitalis cedretorum is a species of flowering plant in family Plantaginaceae that is native to Morocco. In the World Flora Online it is listed as a synonym of Digitalis subalpina.

It was first described as Digitalis lutea subsp. cedretorum in 1936 by the French botanist Louis Emberger. Another French botanist, René Maire, raised it to an independent species four years later, 1940. It was first collected in a cedar woodland on a granite-derived substrate, at 2,500 metres in altitude in the eastern Atlas Mountains, north of a town called Masker.

References

cedretorum
flora of Morocco